The Western College Program was created in 1974 when the Western College for Women merged with Miami University. The program consisted of an interdisciplinary living/learning community with small class sizes and student-designed focuses. Majors included Interdisciplinary Studies, Environmental Science, and Environmental Studies. Academics were divided into three core areas: Creativity and Culture, Social Systems, and Natural Systems.

Western, also known as the School of Interdisciplinary Studies, was cited as a primary reason for Miami University making the list of "Public Ivies" in Richard Moll's book, The Public Ivies: A Guide to America's Best Public Undergraduate Colleges and Universities. In the mid-1960s, when it was the Western College for Women, the campus served as the staging ground for Freedom Summer, a voter registration drive in Mississippi.

The Western campus
Located directly east of the main campus of Miami University, Western College is characterized by winding pathways through forest and stone bridges over creeks. Peabody Hall, currently a coed dormitory, is said to be haunted by its namesake Helen Peabody. Other buildings on Western Campus include McKee Hall, Mary Lyon Hall, Kumler Chapel, Western Lodge, Ernst Theater, Western Tower, Ice House, Summer House, Sawyer Hall (former gymnasium, heating plant, pool and dining hall), Boyd Hall, Hoyt Hall, the Art Museum, and non-WCP buildings, Clawson Hall, Alexander Dining Hall, Presser Hall, Langstroth Cottage, Havighurst Hall, and Thomson Hall.

Merger with College of Arts and Sciences
In March 2006, Miami University Provost Jeffrey Herbst recommended to Miami University President Dr. James C. Garland that the Western College Program be phased out in favor of expanding Miami's Honors Program. The proposal called for the creation of the Western Honors College. This proposal met with resistance from Western faculty, students and alumnae.

On June 23, 2006, The Board of Trustees voted to eliminate the School of Interdisciplinary Studies in favor of a "Western Honors College" in an attempt to expand the honors program at Miami.

On October 24, 2006, the University Senate began deliberations on the persistence of the program (without the school classification).

In January 2007, it was announced that the Western College Program would be merged into the College of Arts and Sciences. The Western College Program became the Western Program, Department of Individualized Studies. Rather than having a department of permanent faculty, the program would have one central faculty member with students taking classes led by faculty in several different departments. Students now receive a Bachelor of Arts or Bachelor of Science degree rather than the Bachelor of Philosophy its graduates were awarded in the Western College Program. Critics say the program may provide diverse courses with faculty from different backgrounds but the student-faculty bond which was a strongly beneficial attribute of Western's previous incarnation may suffer. However, such concerns have turned out to be largely unfounded. The alleged plan to rid Western of permanent faculty never came to pass. After the transition, many Western College Program faculty remained as full-time faculty members for the Western Program.

Notable alumni

 Leslie Greene Bowman, President of the Thomas Jefferson Foundation
 Shelia Curran, author
 Ryan Donmoyer, congressional and White House correspondent for Bloomberg News
 Jeffrey Horst, Atlanta Lawyer
 Chris Jennings, senior health care adviser for President Bill Clinton
 Austin Kleon, author of Newspaper Blackout and How to Steal Like an Artist
 Barbara A. Knuth, Professor and Dean of the Graduate School, Cornell University
 Bill McMahon, managing director of Goldman Sachs
 Jan Montgomery, Assistant General Counsel for Homeland Security & Justice, US GAO
 Thomas Porter, PhD., Senior Advisor to the USPS CISO's Office
 Tim Race, Business Editor, The New York Times
 David Rankin, CEO Great Lakes Protection Fund
 Steve Ricchetti, White House Deputy Chief of Staff for President Bill Clinton
 Ken Weil, Deputy Chief of Staff for Colorado Governor Bill Ritter

References

External links
 Western Program website
 Western Round-Up Student Newspaper - Digital Collection
 Western College Memorial Archives

Miami University
1974 establishments in Ohio